{{DISPLAYTITLE:C14H12O2}}
The molecular formula C14H12O2 (molar mass : 212.24 g/mol, exact mass: 212.08373 u) may refer to:

 Benzoin
 Benzyl benzoate
 Felbinac, a medicine
 1-Keto-1,2,3,4-tetrahydrophenanthrene, a syntethic estrogen
 Pinosylvin, a stilbenoid
 3,4'-Dihydroxystilbene, a stilbenoid
 Stilbestrol, a stilbenoid